The Üzemchin (Mongolian: Үзэмчин), also written Ujumchin, Ujumucin or Ujimqin, are a subgroup of Mongols in eastern Mongolia and Inner Mongolia. They settle mainly in Sergelen, Bayantu'men, Choibalsan city of the Dornod Province and in Xilin Gol League of the Inner Mongolia. In Mongolia, Some Üzemchins migrated there from Xilin Gol immediately after China was freed from the Japanese in 1945.

The Üzemchin was included the Chahar tumen of the six tumen eastern Mongols in Northern Yuan Dynasty. The land of Ongon-Dural, the third son of Bodi Alagh Khan of the Northern Yuan was called Üzemchin. The name probably originates from the Mongolian language word "uzem" meaning "raisin" as in "raisin pickers/collectors."

The Üzemchin language is a dialect of Chakhar Mongolian.

See also
 East Ujimqin Banner
 West Ujimqin Banner

References 

Mongol peoples
Southern Mongols
Ethnic groups in Mongolia